The original soundtrack album for the third season of the Netflix series Stranger Things, titled Stranger Things 3, was released digitally on June 28, 2019, via Lakeshore and Invada Records. Like the previous two seasons, the soundtrack was composed by Kyle Dixon and Michael Stein of the electronic band Survive. The album was also released on physical formats such as CD, vinyl, and cassette.

Composition
In a press release that accompanied the announcement of the score's release, Dixon and Stein disclosed that they made an album "that doesn’t feel like a ‘score’ necessarily, but one that feels more like a stand-alone record than a collection of brief cues. We’ve incorporated the main narrative elements of the series and stayed true to the original sound while at the same time expanding on our musical palette – we often pushed it to the limit." They also stated that they "made an effort to curate this album to showcase the moments we think are really special."

Track listing

Charts

References

Music of Stranger Things
Television soundtracks
2019 soundtrack albums